Yi Dang (이당; 李瑭, February 1, 1783 – May 8, 1826) was a member of the Korean Joseon Dynasty. Despite his royal lineage he didn't receive a title during his lifetime, as his older brother was Crown Prince Sanggye and his mother, Princess Consort Sangsan of the Jincheon Song clan, his father, Prince Euneon, and his sister-in-law, Princess Consort Shin of Pyeongsan Shin clan, were charged and executed for treason during the Catholic Persecution of 1801.

His half-brother was Grand Internal Prince Jeongye, father of Cheoljong of Joseon.

Life 
Yi Dang's birth father, Yi In, Prince Euneon, was an illegitimate son of Crown Prince Sado and Royal Noble Consort Suk of the Buan Im clan, a daughter of Im Ji-beon. He was later adopted by Yi Chan, Prince Eunjeon, another illegitimate son of Crown Prince Sado and younger half-brother of Prince Euneon. Prince Eunjeon's mother was Royal Noble Consort Gyeong of the Park clan.

Details of his childhood and early life are unknown.

His wife, Lady Kim of the Gwangsangun Kim clan had no issues. He had a son by his concubine, Lady Yi of the Jeonju Yi clan, named Yi Hui, who was adopted by his original full-brother, Crown Prince Sanggye, and appointed as Prince Ikpyeong.

A long time after his death, he was honored as Prince Punggye (풍계군; 豐溪君).

Originally, his grave was in Dongmak-dong, Ansan, but later it was moved to Dangjeong-dong, Gunpo City, near his adoptive father, Prince Eunjeon's grave.

Ancestry

See also 
 Prince Euneon
 Prince Eunjeon
 Crown Prince Sangkye
 Yi Sung-deuk
 Cheoljong of Joseon

References

Heirs apparent who never acceded
19th-century Korean people
1783 births
1826 deaths
House of Yi